Methyl thiocyanate is an organic compound with the formula CH3SCN.  The simplest member of the organic thiocyanates, it is a colourless liquid with an onion-like odor.  It is produced by the methylation of thiocyanate salts.  The compound is a precursor to the more useful isomer methyl isothiocyanate (CH3NCS).

Safety
The LD50 is 60 mg/kg (rats, oral).

It is listed as an extremely hazardous substance by the United States's Emergency Planning and Community Right-to-Know Act.

References 

Thiocyanates
Methyl esters
Foul-smelling chemicals